Francoa is a genus of flowering plants in the family Francoaceae, which consists of herbaceous perennials endemic to Chile. Plants may grow up to one metre high and produce basal clumps of round, deeply lobed, dark green, fuzzy leaves with winged leafstalks. Compact racemes of small, cup-shaped flowers, which are pink with red markings, appear in summer and early fall.

Species
 Francoa alba 
 Francoa appendiculata 
 Francoa glabrata 
 Francoa lyrata 
 Francoa ramosa 
 Francoa rupestris 
 Francoa sonchifolia  (Bridal wreath)

References

 
Endemic flora of Chile
Geraniales genera
Taxa named by Antonio José Cavanilles